Redcar is a seaside town on the Yorkshire Coast in the Redcar and Cleveland unitary authority in the county of North Yorkshire, England.

The Teesside built-up area's Redcar subdivision had a population of 37,073 at the 2011 Census. The town is made up of Coatham, Dormanstown, Kirkleatham, Newcomen, West Dyke, Wheatlands and Zetland. 

It gained a town charter in 1922, from then until 1968 it was governed by the municipal borough of Redcar. Since the abolition of County Borough of Teesside, which existed from 1968 until 1974, the town has been unparished.

History

Origins 

Redcar occupies a low-lying site by the sea; the second element of its name is from Old Norse kjarr, meaning 'marsh', and the first may be either Old English (Anglo-Saxon) rēad meaning 'red' or OE hrēod 'reed'. The town originated as a fishing hamlet in the 14th century, trading with the larger adjacent hamlet of Coatham. Until the mid-19th century it was within the parish of Marske-by-the-Sea – mentioned in the Domesday book.

Zetland lifeboat 

Numerous ships have foundered off the Redcar coastline and many of their wrecks still exist. The Zetland is the world's oldest surviving lifeboat. It was built by Henry Greathead of South Shields and is housed in a volunteer-led sea-front museum. The lifeboat was first stationed at Redcar in 1802.

Victorian Era 
As seaside holidays became fashionable in the early 19th century, Redcar's facilities expanded. By 1841, Redcar had 794 inhabitants. In 1846, work was completed on the Middlesbrough and Redcar Railway and the presently named  station, created to attract tourism and trade.

Redcar's population expansion corresponded with Middlesbrough's, with the discovery in 1850 of iron ore in the Eston area of Cleveland Hills. Redcar prospered as a seaside town drawing tourists attracted by eight miles of sands stretching from South Gare to Saltburn-by-the-Sea.

Plans for a pier were drawn up in 1866, but lay dormant until prompted by the announcement of plans to build a pier at Coatham in 1871. Coatham Pier was wrecked before it was completed when two sailing ships were driven through it in a storm. It had to be shortened because of the cost of repairs and was re-opened with an entrance with two kiosks and a roller-skating rink on the Redcar side, and a bandstand halfway along its length.

Redcar Racecourse was created in 1875. Redcar Pier, another pier as well as Coatham Pier, was built in the late 1870s. In October 1880 the brig Luna caused £1,000 worth of damage to this pier. In New Year's Eve 1885 SS Cochrane demolished the landing stage. and in 1897 the schooner Amarant went through the pier. A year later, its head and bandstand burned down.

In October 1898 the Coatham Pier was almost wrecked when the barque Birger struck it and the pier was thereafter allowed to disintegrate. An anchor from the Birger can be seen on the sea front pavement close to the Zetland Lifeboat Museum.

In 1907 a pavilion ballroom was built on Redcar Pier behind the entrance kiosks and in 1928 it was extended. A glass house for concerts was added to the remains of Coatham Pier's entrance. The presently named  railway station was built in 1929.

In 1929 Coatham Pier's glasshouse was replaced by the New Pavilion theatre. After the war, comedian and entertainer Larry Grayson coined his catchphrase "Shut that Door!" while performing there, since the stage door was open to the cold North Sea breeze.

Second World War 
Redcar Pier was deliberately breached (sectioned) in 1940 to prevent its use by enemy invasion forces. As a result of sectioning, damage by a mine explosion and deterioration it was never reconnected and instead allowed to become even more dilapidated.

Post war 

In 1964 the New Pavilion Theatre was transformed into the Regent Cinema. The Redcar Pier pavilion continued in use after the war but storm damage led to it being declared unsafe and it was demolished in 1980–1981.
Redcar Steelworks

The town's main employers in the post-war era were the nearby Teesside Steelworks at Warrenby, founded by Dorman Long in 1917, and the ICI Wilton chemical works. The steel produced at Dorman Long was used to build the Sydney Harbour Bridge, Tyne Bridge, Auckland Harbour Bridge and many others. Both the Warrenby and Lackenby sites became part of Tata Steel when Corus was taken over in 2007, but continued to trade under the Corus name until at least February 2008. SSI bought the plant from Tata Steel in February 2011, for £320 million.

After a two-year hiatus following the mothballing of the plant in February 2010, steel was once again being made at Redcar. The Thai owners of the former Corus Plant at Lackenby, Sahaviriya Steel Industries (SSI), re-ignited the blast furnace, one of the largest in Europe, on 15 April 2012.

On 18 September 2015, production was paused due to the decline in steel prices. On 28 September 2015, the plant was "mothballed" amid poor steel trading conditions across the world and a drop in steel prices. On 2 October, the owner of the site, SSI UK, entered liquidation. On 12 October 2015 the administrator announced that there was no realistic prospect of finding a buyer and the ovens would be extinguished.

Governance

Wards and areas
Wards periodically change, as of 2018 the town is made up of Coatham, Dormanstown, Kirkleatham, Newcomen, West Dyke, Wheatlands and Zetland. Redcar is made up of areas that do not lend their name to a ward: Warrenby, Lakes Estate, Redcar East, The Ings, Ings Farm, Mickledales and Westfield.

On 5 May 2011 Redcar elected its councillors to Redcar & Cleveland Borough Council. There was a by-election on 18 November 2011 for two vacant seats in the Zetland ward, held onto by the Liberal Democrats, and on 19 January 2012 there was a by-election for a vacant seat in Newcomen ward subsequently gained by Labour from the Liberal Democrats.

Authority
The Redcar civil parish existed from 1866 until 1968. A district in Redcar's name formed in 1885. Three years after the district was formed, the centuries-old Yorkshire authority was replaced by the North Riding of Yorkshire county council. The district became an urban district in 1894.
 
The settlement's town charter occurred in 1922, the district was able to be styled as a municipal borough and the settlement as a town. The municipal borough was merged into the County Borough of Teesside in 1968, removing it from the administrative county however still ceremonially in the area.

The 1974 reform created the non-metropolitan County of Cleveland, under the Langbaurgh non-metropolitan district. The county was also inserted into the North East England region. After further changes in 1996, the district became a unitary authority called Redcar & Cleveland in the ceremonial county of North Yorkshire, the county straddling two regions of England.

The North East England region was sub-divided into combined authorities, in May 2017 the Tees Valley area voted for their first mayor. The Conservative candidate, Ben Houchen, won the election and is now in his second term.

Parliament
From 1987 to 2001, the local Member of Parliament (MP) was Mo Mowlam.  From 2001 to 2010 the MP was Vera Baird.
In the 2010 general election there was a swing to the Liberal Democrats with Ian Swales being elected. But, in the 2015 general election, Anna Turley, a Labour MP, won back Redcar. In the snap 2017 general election, Anna Turley held onto that seat. In the general election held on 12 December 2019, Anna Turley lost her seat to conservative candidate Jacob Young with a majority of 3,527 votes. Young becomes the third conservative MP to represent Redcar, the first being Royal Naval Commander Robert Tatton Bower 1931 to 1945 and Scarborough businessman Wilfred Proudfoot between 1959 and 1964 when Redcar was part of the Cleveland constituency.

Culture and community

Culture

The Palace Hub, on the beach front, was built by Redcar and Cleveland Council for the creative and cultural sector of the town. An art gallery and business start up centre are located in the building. The main library is in the Redcar Heart building in the centre of the town and there is a long-standing Redcar Literary Institute, which was founded in 1896.

Redcar is home to the Tuned In! Centre, which opened in 2011 and overlooks the sea front. The multi purpose venue hosts live music as well as creative workshops for young people. The annual event Clubland on the Beach, which showcases dance acts attracting visitors from across the country, has been held at Majuba Road in Redcar for the past three years.

Parks

The town has had several parks built for tourism: Coatham Enclosure, Locke Park, Zetland Park, Lily Park, an Amusement Park with a roller coaster, and a small sea front park known locally as Titty Bottle Park. The Amusement Park near the railway closed decades ago, and Titty Bottle Park was absorbed into the redeveloped sea front around Redcar Beacon.

Landmarks

Former Coatham Hotel 

The Victorian, former Coatham Hotel stands on Newcomen Terrace sea front.  The ballroom of the hotel was home to the Redcar Jazz Club, a venue for the up-and-coming bands of the late 1960s and early 1970s.

Redcar Beacon 

Construction of the Redcar Beacon started in 2011.
In 2013 it was nominated for the Building Design Carbuncle Cup for worst new building. It came third in the whole of the UK. In December 2015, the Beacon was damaged by winds from Storm Desmond, with several large pieces of panelling falling onto the beach below. It was also damaged in winter 2016, where a panel from the top fell off in a storm.

Listed buildings

There are 23 listed buildings in Redcar. The Grade I Listed Sir William Turner's Hospital in Kirkleatham was built between 1674-1676 and listed on the 14 June 1952.

At the west end of High Street is a Grade II listed clock tower,
a memorial to King Edward VII who was a regular visitor to Redcar. The tower has now been refurbished. On the Esplanade is the Grade II-Listed Zetland Lifeboat Museum housing the world's oldest lifeboat Zetland Lifeboat.

In the south-east of Redcar is an aircraft listening post built in 1916 during the First World War as part of a regional defence system to detect approaching aircraft, principally Zeppelins, and give early warning.It is an example of an acoustic mirror, of which other examples can be found along the east coast of Britain. The mirror was used up until the invention of radar and although it was built on open fields today a modern housing estate now surrounds it.
Only the concrete sound mirror remains and is now a Grade II listed building.

Religion

To the east of Redcar is the grade II* listed Church of St Peter, designed by Ignatius Bonomi and built 1822–29. In 1818, Lord Dundas gave land for a church, St Peters. The foundation stone was laid by Lady Turner of Kirkleatham in 1823. Initially it was a daughter church of Marske, but became an independent parish in 1867. It has a window commemorating local benefactor Sir William Turner.

Transport 

Redcar has two railway stations, on the Tees Valley line, with trains operated by Northern and TransPennine Express, namely Redcar Central and Redcar East. A third station Redcar British Steel, which closed in December 2019, served the steelworks.

The main roads through the town are the A1085 and the A1042, with the A174 bypassing. Redcar is served primarily by Arriva North East buses, connecting Redcar with the surrounding towns and villages.

The Pangea North and CANTAT-3 submarine telecommunication cables both come ashore between Redcar and Marske-by-the-Sea.

Education 

The town's further education college is Redcar & Cleveland College.

The town's secondary schools are: Outwood Academy Redcar, Sacred Heart Catholic Secondary and Rye Hills Academy.

There are eleven primary schools in Redcar: Coatham, Dormanstown, Green Gates, Ings Farm, John E Batty, Lakes, Newcomen, Riverdale, St Benedict's, Wheatlands and Zetland.

Sport 
In Coatham is Cleveland Golf Club, the first golf club to be formed in Yorkshire. It was established in 1887 and is a links course. Also in Coatham is Redcar Cricket Club, which play in the NYSD league, and Redcar Running Club.

Redcar Rugby Union Football club play at Mackinlay Park.

Redcar Racecourse is one of nine thoroughbred horse racecourses in Yorkshire. There is also a motorcycle speedway racing team, the Redcar Bears racing in the SGB Championship. The race track is at the South Tees Motorsport Park in Southbank Street, South Bank and is unusual in that one bend is more highly banked than the other. The team was formerly captained by 1992 World Champion Gary Havelock and was formerly managed by his father Brian. 

The town is set to host the 2022 Tour of Britain stage four, 
UCI Europe Tour cycling race. The town was previously set to host a stage of the Tour de Yorkshire, the event was affected by the COVID-19 pandemic.

Notable people 

 Gertrude Bell, colonial administrator and contemporary of Lawrence of Arabia spent her youthful years at Red Barns House in Coatham, which became, for a time, the Red Barns Hotel and a listed building.
 The surviving negatives of Redcar photographer Alfred Edward Graham (1882–1945) were acquired by Redcar Urban District Council's Library and Museum Committee and are now held by the Redcar and Cleveland Museum Service.
 Rex Hunt, governor of the Falkland Islands during the 1982 invasion by Argentina, attended Coatham School.
 The former Secretary of State for Northern Ireland, Mo Mowlam, represented Redcar parliamentary constituency in the House of Commons.
 Film and television actors Pip Donaghy, June Laverick, and Wendy Hall, and actor/director/producer Robert Porter were all born in Redcar.
 Actor and radio actor Felicity Finch, famous for her part in the Archers BBC Radio 4 drama series, playing Ruth Archer, was also born and grew up in Redcar.
 Singer David Coverdale, lead singer with Deep Purple and Whitesnake lived in Redcar as a youth and worked in the Gentry clothes shop on Coatham Road.
 Chris Norman, founder member and former lead singer of Smokie was born in Redcar.
 Pete York, drummer with the Spencer Davis Group and session drummer was born in Redcar.
 Paralympian, Baroness Tanni Grey-Thompson, originally from Wales, lived in Redcar for a number of years with her husband and daughter.
 2011 and 2016 UCI Downhill World Champion Danny Hart was born in and currently lives in Redcar, he is frequently nicknamed "The Redcar Rocket" by commentators.
 David Wheater, Bolton Wanderers and England national football team central defender, grew up and still lives in Redcar.
 Snooker player Mike Dunn was born in Middlesbrough but lives in Redcar.
 Jordan Jones, Rangers FC and Northern Ireland national football team midfielder was born in Redcar.

Filmography and Television 
Atonement

In 2006, Redcar was used as a location for the film adaptation of the Ian McEwan novel Atonement. The Coatham Hotel, Regent Cinema, a section of Newcomen Terrace and part of the beach were dressed as 1940s Dunkirk. Filming took place across three days in August 2006, with local men playing the soldiers.

The Secret Millionaire

In 2010, Redcar was featured on the Channel 4 television programme The Secret Millionaire. David Jamilly a humanitarian, philanthropist and self-made millionaire, visited the Redcar community and gave £25,000 to Zoë's Place for a sensory room, £25,000 to Redcar Amateur Boxing Club to start an Olympic fund, and £25,000 to Sid's Place for special counselling.

There was a subsequent visit on 14 May to a screening at Redcar's cinema, attended by the mayor and mayoress along with all the charities and people involved.
The feature of the documentary involved the closure of the nearby Corus steelworks as well as the charities. On 9 December 2011, Jamilly opened the new Redcar Education Development centre in Park Avenue, Redcar. The centre provides day care for adults with learning difficulties. He also opened the Redcar Primary Care Hospital on 9 December 2011 and the new Sid's Place on 15 December 2011.

The Mighty Redcar

The town was filmed for the 2018 BBC television documentary The Mighty Redcar. The four-part series followed young people from Redcar and surrounding towns as they completed their studies and looked for work.

See also 
 Redcar Academy
 Redcar Rocks
 South Gare & Coatham Sands SSSI

References

External links 

 Tourist information: this is Redcar & Cleveland
 
 A Redcar local history site
 Tides at the River Tees entrance on the BBC, Easytide, and Tidetimes
 Sunrise and sunset times for Redcar.

 
Towns in North Yorkshire
Places in the Tees Valley
Seaside resorts in England
Populated coastal places in Redcar and Cleveland
Beaches of North Yorkshire
Unparished areas in North Yorkshire